The Soviet Army Cup was an annual knockout football cup tournament held in Bulgaria between 1946 and 1990. Until 1982, it was the country's main cup competition, its winners would qualify for the UEFA Cup Winners' Cup. From 1982, to its ceasure in 1990 the Soviet Army Cup served as a secondary cup tournament.

Winners

As a primary cup competition (1946-1982)

As a secondary cup competition (1983-1990)

Notes:
(II) - Clubs representing Bulgarian B Professional Football Group at the moment of the final.
(III) - Clubs representing Bulgarian V AFG at the moment of the final.

Performances

Performance by club

Performance by city

External links
Cup of the Soviet Army znam.bg

Football cup competitions in Bulgaria